Julius Wille (born 27 August 1987) is a Dutch footballer who plays for AGOVV in the Derde Klasse.

Career

Netherlands
Wille played for the youth teams of Robur et Velocitas, FC Twente and Heracles Almelo, before turning professional with AGOVV Apeldoorn in 2006. He played 70 games with AGOVV in the Dutch Eerste Divisie, before being lured to the United States in 2010 by coach Sonny Silooy to play with the new Dayton Dutch Lions in the USL Premier Development League.

United States
Wille played 16 games for the Dutch Lions in their debut season in the USL Premier Development League in 2010, scoring 3 goals and contributing 1 assist, and returned to the Netherlands to play with AGOVV again in the Eerste Divisie in 2010-11, before continuing with the Lions following their self-promotion to the USL Professional Division in 2011.

Return to the Netherlands
Wille returned to AGOVV after his second stint with the Dayton Dutch Lions in 2011. At the start of the 2011–12 season, he fell out of favor with head coach Hans van Arum and was demoted from the first. He practiced with Jong Vitesse for a while and also saw a trial with Fortuna Sittard turn out unsuccessful.

In the summer of 2012 he joined Topklasse club SC Genemuiden. He left there in November 2012 for a trial in Malaysia. Wille completed the 2012–13 season with the then Tweede Klasse team Veensche Boys. In the 2013–14 season, Wille played for Koninklijke HFC. After this, he returned to Veensche Boys and in 2015 he began playing for the amateurs of AGOVV. In the 2019–20 season, Wille returned to the AGOVV team after a career break, competing in the Derde Klasse that season.

References

External links
 Dayton Dutch Lions profile

1987 births
Living people
Dutch footballers
Dutch expatriate footballers
AGOVV Apeldoorn players
Dayton Dutch Lions players
Eerste Divisie players
USL League Two players
USL Championship players
Expatriate soccer players in the United States
Sportspeople from Amstelveen
Association football forwards
Koninklijke HFC players
Dutch expatriate sportspeople in the United States
FC Twente players
Heracles Almelo players
SC Genemuiden players
Footballers from North Holland